Tom Brodie (born 1978) is an English actor, who first appeared on British television screens as a young boy, and remained active into his early 20s.

Regular TV appearances
Watt on Earth, 1991–1992, as Sean Ruddock.
Chris Cross, 1993, as  Mookie.
The Vet, 1996, as Steven Holt.
Kavanagh QC, 1995–1999, as Matt Kavanagh.

References

1978 births
English male television actors
English male child actors
Living people